Bridge Street Bridge, also known as the County Bridge #387, is a historic reinforced concrete bridge located at Elkhart, Elkhart County, Indiana.  It was built in 1939 and spans the St. Joseph River.  The bridge measures 272 feet long and consists of a 116 foot long center span, flanked by 67 foot long spans to the east and west.  It measures 52 feet wide, with a 40-foot roadway and 6 foot sidewalks on either side.

It was added to the National Register of Historic Places in 2009.

References

Road bridges on the National Register of Historic Places in Indiana
Bridges completed in 1939
Buildings and structures in Elkhart, Indiana
National Register of Historic Places in Elkhart County, Indiana
Concrete bridges in the United States
Transportation buildings and structures in Elkhart County, Indiana